Thomas Alexander Marshall (January 15, 1794 – April 17, 1871) was a U.S. Representative from Kentucky, son of Humphrey Marshall (1760–1841).

Born near Versailles, Kentucky, Marshall pursued preparatory studies.
He graduated from Yale College in 1815, and then studied law.
He was admitted to the bar and commenced practice in Frankfort in 1817.
He moved to Paris, Kentucky, in 1819.
He served as a member of the Kentucky House of Representatives in 1827 and 1828.

Marshall was elected as an Anti-Jacksonian to the Twenty-second and Twenty-third Congresses (March 4, 1831 – March 3, 1835).
He was an unsuccessful candidate for reelection in 1834 to the Twenty-fourth Congress.
He served as judge of the State court of appeals 1835-1856.
He was professor in the law department of Transylvania College, Lexington, Kentucky from 1836 to 1849.
He moved to Louisville in 1859.
He served again as a member of the state house of representatives in 1863.
He was chief justice of the court of appeals in 1866 and 1867.
He died in Louisville, Kentucky, April 17, 1871, and his remains were interred at Lexington Cemetery.

References

External links
 
 

1794 births
1871 deaths
19th-century American politicians
Members of the Kentucky House of Representatives
Transylvania University faculty
National Republican Party members of the United States House of Representatives from Kentucky
Yale University alumni
People from Woodford County, Kentucky
People from Paris, Kentucky
Politicians from Lexington, Kentucky
Politicians from Louisville, Kentucky